MV Buffalo Soldier (T-AK-9301) is a roll-on/roll-off ship, formerly of the French Government Line (now merged into CMA CGM). She was sold and reflagged U.S., renamed to honor Buffalo Soldiers, and chartered by the United States Navy Military Sealift Command as a Maritime Prepositioning ship serving at Diego Garcia laden with U.S. Air Force munitions. She is self-sustaining, that is, she can unload herself, an asset in harbors with little or no infrastructure. Her 120-long-ton-capacity roll-on/roll-off ramp accommodates tracked and wheeled vehicles of every description. While she is not currently in service with MSC, ships with her general characteristics are designated Buffalo Soldier class, fleet designation AK 2222.

See also

References

External links

Maritime Prepositioning Squadron Two

Cargo ships of the United States Navy
1977 ships